A malt shovel is a shovel used during malting, part of the brewing process.

Malt shovel could also refer to:
 Malt Shovel Brewery, in Australia
 Malt Shovel, Spondon, a public house in Derby
 Malt Shovel (sculpture), a public art installation in Burton upon Trent